Mpho Makola (born 4 May 1986) is a South African soccer player who plays as a midfielder for National First Division club Polokwane City FC. He previously played for Free State Stars and Orlando Pirates, before being transferred to Cape Town City in 2019. He parted ways with Cape Town City in early February 2023.

Early life
Makola was born and raised in Alexandra and attended school in Yeoville Community Primary School and Barnato Park High School where he was a sports all rounder. He joined the Kaizer Chiefs academy in 1999 from Alex Sheffield. By the age of 15, Makola became his family's main breadwinner and took care of his mother and six siblings. As a teenager, Makola consumed drugs and hung around gangsters and nearly joined a hijacking syndicate. He later played for Vaal University of Technology and earned R900 a month.

Career statistics

International career
He scored on his international debut against Senegal in an international friendly on 8 September 2015.

International goals
Scores and results list South Africa's goal tally first.

References

1986 births
Association football midfielders
Living people
South African soccer players
People from Alexandra, Gauteng
Free State Stars F.C. players
Orlando Pirates F.C. players
Cape Town City F.C. (2016) players
South African Premier Division players
Sportspeople from Gauteng